RUA may refer to:

Royal Ulster Academy, an Irish artist organization
Robot Unicorn Attack, an online game first published in 2010
Royal University of Agriculture, Cambodia, a public university in Phnom Penh
^RUA, Russell 3000 Index ticker symbol
 NETL-RUA, the United States Department of Energy’s National Energy Technology Laboratory (NETL) Regional University Alliance (RUA), a partnership to solving energy problems

See also
 Rua (disambiguation)